Bowdoin Square (established 1788) in Boston, Massachusetts was located in the West End. In the 18th and 19th centuries it featured residential houses, leafy trees, a church, hotel, theatre and other buildings. Among the notables who have lived in the square: physician Thomas Bulfinch; merchant Kirk Boott; and mayor Theodore Lyman. The urban renewal project in the West End in the 1950s removed Green Street and Chardon Street, which formerly ran into the square, and renamed some existing streets; it is now a traffic intersection at Cambridge Street, Bowdoin Street, and New Chardon Street.  

Bowdoin Square is served by the MBTA Blue Line station Bowdoin.

Brief history
Some of the features of Bowdoin Square in its heyday included:
 Kirk Boott house (built 1804). "The half-acre lot on which Boott build his brick house was then a pasture in Boston's West End, an area that was just beginning to be developed. Boott's 3-story Federal mansion, with its tall Palladian windows lighting the staircase overlooking the garden, was very likely designed by Charles Bulfinch."
 Samuel Parkman house (built c. 1816). "The large granite double house which stood for years at the western end of Bowdoin Square was built about 1816 by Hon. Samuel Parkman, a rich merchant. He was father of Dr.George Parkman who was murdered in 1849 by John White Webster ... [and] grandfather of Francis Parkman, the historian."
 Baptist Tabernacle (built 1840); also known as the Bowdoin-Square Church or the Bowdoin Square Baptist Church
 Revere House hotel (1847–1912)
 United States Court House (19th century)
 Bowdoin Square Hotel
 Bowdoin Square Theatre

Images

References

Further reading
 Fire in Bowdoin Square, Last Evening. Boston Daily Globe, Jan 7, 1874. p.1.
 Bowdoin Square Literary Union Entertainment. Boston Daily Globe (1872-1922); Boston, Mass. Dec 1, 1875. p.4.
 The Outside Show: Illuminations Along the Line of March- Columns Avenue a Blaze of Light--The Display Elsewhere--Some of the More Prominent Illuminations and Decorations. Boston Daily Globe, Oct 27, 1876. p.8.
 Twelve missing in Boston fire; Blaze Starts in Old Revere House and Spreads to Nearby Buildings. New York Times, Jan 16, 1912. p.1.
 Robert Campbell. From square to bare; once filled with stately homes, Bowdoin Square's modern incarnation is decidedly less impressive. Boston Globe. May 21, 2006.

External links

 Library of Congress. A Group of Boot-Blacks in Bowdoin Square, a Passing Juvenile Industry. Location: Boston, Massachusetts. Photo by Lewis Hine, 1909
 Google news archive. Articles about Bowdoin Square
 Flickr. Photo of Cambridge Street looking toward Bowdoin Square, 1950s
 Flickr. Photos of area that was Bowdoin Square by Gig Harmon, 2009
 Flickr. Gleason's. Cambridge omnibus, Benjamin Franklin, passing Bowdoin Square church in a snow storm, 1852
 Flickr. Boston and Cambridge New Horse Railroad (Bowdoin Square), c. 1856 engraving

Squares in Boston
West End, Boston
1788 establishments in Massachusetts
Former buildings and structures in Boston